Endoxyla coscinopa is a moth in the family Cossidae. It is found in Australia, where it has been recorded from Western Australia.

References

Endoxyla (moth)
Moths described in 1901